Hostert may refer to:

 Hostert, Niederanven, a small town in Niederanven, Luxembourg
 Hostert, Rambrouch, a small town in Rambrouch, Luxembourg
 Hostert (Schwalmtal), a residential area in Schwalmtal, North Rhine-Westphalia, Germany
Jasmina Hostert (born 1982), Bosnian-German politician